The Sutphin Boulevard station was a station on the demolished section of the BMT Jamaica Line in Queens, New York City.

History 
This station was built as part of the Dual Contracts. It opened on July 3, 1918, after the Atlantic Avenue Rapid Transit service was eliminated from Jamaica Station. 

The station closed on September 10, 1977, with the Q49 bus replacing it until December 11, 1988, in anticipation of the Archer Avenue Subway, and due to political pressure in the area.

This station along with the 168th Street and 160th Street stations was demolished in 1979. It was replaced by the Sutphin Boulevard–Archer Avenue–JFK Airport station, which opened on December 11, 1988. Between the closing of the el station and its replacement subway station, the existing Sutphin Boulevard station, four blocks to the north on Hillside Avenue served as a temporary substitute.

Station layout 
It had two tracks and two side platforms, with space for a third track in the center. This station had provisions built in its structure to convert it into an express station, if the center third track was to be built. The other station on the line that had such provisions was the Woodhaven Boulevard station.

See also
 Sutphin Boulevard station (IND Queens Boulevard Line)
 Sutphin Boulevard–Archer Avenue–JFK Airport station

References

External links
 
 

Railway stations in the United States opened in 1918
1916 establishments in New York City
Railway stations closed in 1977
Defunct BMT Jamaica Line stations
1977 disestablishments in New York (state)
1918 establishments in New York City
Former elevated and subway stations in Queens, New York
Jamaica, Queens